Heath Town railway station was a station built by the Wolverhampton and Walsall Railway in 1872, and was operated by the Midland Railway from 1876 onwards. It served the Heath Town area of Wolverhampton, and was located just off Grove Street.

The station closed in 1910.

Station site today

The station site has since been built on with the exception of the bridge and line as they remain but overgrown and the Wolverhampton bound line been lifted and the support for it removed leaving a big hole on the left of the bridge. Some rail is still present on the Walsall bound line and some supports of the former stairs to the Walsall bound platform.

See also 
 List of closed railway stations in Britain

References

Disused railway stations in Wolverhampton
Railway stations in Great Britain opened in 1872
Railway stations in Great Britain closed in 1910
Former Midland Railway stations